VOICE is the first mini album released by the J-Urban artist Emi Hinouchi.

Track listing 
 小さな光 feat. AZU
 Catch Me!!!
 卒業 -congratulations- feat. Lotus Juice
 Diary...
 growing up
 VOICE
 サマーデイズ
 君のために -smile remix-

2011 albums